The 2021 NAB League Boys season was the 29th season of the NAB League Boys competition for under-19 male Australian rules footballers in Victoria. The season commenced on 27 March and concluded on 3 September, after the AFL announced the cessation of further matches due the impact of the COVID-19 pandemic.

Format
The league consists of 13 full-time teams (12 from Victoria and 1 from Tasmania) competing in a nine-to-eighteen round regular season. There are also five academy teams that partake in some matches but are not eligible for finals (those teams are Sydney Swans Academy, GWS Giants Academy, Brisbane Lions Academy, Gold Coast Suns Academy and Northern Territory).

The season was again impacted by the COVID-19 pandemic. The Victorian Government imposed health orders in the latter half of the season that prevented matches from being played. A total of 68 regular season matches were played before the AFL announced on 3 September that there would be no further matches for metropolitan teams. The league kept open the possibility of resuming matches for country-based teams, though this did not eventuate.

Ladder

See also
 2021 NAB League Girls season

References

External links
 Season results (Australian Football)

NAB League
Nab League Boys